Leopold Fall (2 February 187316 September 1925) was an Austrian Kapellmeister and composer of operettas.

Life
Born in Olmütz (Olomouc), Leo (or Leopold) Fall was taught by his father Moritz Fall (1848–1922), a bandmaster and composer, who settled in Berlin. The younger Fall studied at the Vienna Conservatory before rejoining his father in Berlin. His teachers in Vienna were Robert Fuchs and Johann Nepomuk Fuchs. In 1895 he began a new career as an operetta conductor in Hamburg, and started to compose. From 1904 onwards he devoted himself to composition. While less successful than his contemporary Franz Lehár, he was nevertheless capable of producing melodious and well orchestrated work. After working in Berlin, Hamburg and Cologne he settled in Vienna in 1906, where he died. He is buried at the Vienna Central Cemetery.

His brothers  and Richard were also composers; both were murdered in the Nazi concentration camps.

His best known operettas in the English-speaking world are The Dollar Princess and Madame Pompadour, which had successful runs in London and New York and remained in the repertory in Germany and Austria throughout the 20th century.  (1912; Princess Caprice in London) is reported to have been given an unprecedented 3,360 performances.

Stage works
Fall wrote incidental music to numerous plays, and three unsuccessful operas; he is mainly known as a composer of operettas in the Silver Age of Vienna operetta.

Operas:
 Paroli oder Frau Denise (1 act; 1902)
 Irrlicht (1905)
 Der goldene Vogel (1920)

Operettas:

 Der Rebell (Vienna, 1905), later reworked as Der liebe Augustin
 The Merry Farmer (Der fidele Bauer, Mannheim, 1907)
 Die Dollarprinzessin (Vienna, 1907; adapted into English as The Dollar Princess 1909)
 Die geschiedene Frau (Vienna, 1908; adapted into English as The Girl in the Train 1910)
 Der Schrei nach der Ohrfeige (Vienna, 1909)
  (Vienna, 1909)
 Das Puppenmädel (Vienna, 1910)
 Die schöne Risette (Vienna, 1910)
 Die Sirene (Vienna, 1911; adapted into English as The Siren 1911)
 The Eternal Waltz (London, 1911)
  (Berlin, 1912) (Princess Caprice) (performed 3,360 times)
 Die Studentengräfin (Berlin, 1913)
 Der Nachtschnellzug (Vienna, 1913)
 Der Frau Ministerpräsident (Berlin, 1914)
 Der künstliche Mensch (Berlin, 1915)
 Die Kaiserin (Fürstenliebe) (Berlin, 1916)
 The Rose of Stamboul (Vienna, 1916)
 Die spanische Nachtigall (Berlin, 1920)
 Der heilige Ambrosius (Berlin, 1921)
 Die Straßensängerin (Vienna, 1922)
 Madame Pompadour (Berlin, 1922)
 Der süße Kavalier (Berlin, 1923)
 Jugend im Mai (Dresden, 1926)

References
Notes

Sources
"Fall, Leo(pold)" by Andrew Lamb, in The New Grove Dictionary of Opera, ed. Stanley Sadie (London, 1992)

External links 

 
 Fall's stage works, with information about librettists and theatres, musicaltheatreguide.com
 Profile of Fall, musicals101.com

1873 births
1925 deaths
19th-century classical composers
19th-century Austrian male musicians
20th-century classical composers
20th-century Austrian male musicians
Austrian Jews
Austrian male classical composers
Austrian opera composers
Austrian Romantic composers
Burials at the Vienna Central Cemetery
Jewish classical composers
Male opera composers
Musicians from Olomouc
University of Music and Performing Arts Vienna alumni